Defendente may refer to:
 Defendens, a martyr of the Theban Legion
 Defendente Ferrari (c. 1480/1485 – c. 1540), an Italian painter active in Piedmont